"Hearts Beat as One" is a pop rock song written by Jamie Appleby, Melinda Appleby, Melinda Jackson & Tim Henwood, and produced by Ash. It was released in Australia as a digital download on 24 May 2010 and as a CD single on 11 June 2010. The song contains heartbeats contributed by people from around Australia. This song was written for the Socceroos as the official National Anthem for this year 2010 FIFA World Cup. It has also been performed on Sunrise.

Formats and track listings
Australian digital download
(Released 24 May 2010)
 "Hearts Beat as One" (Official Song of the Qantas Socceroos) – 3:40

Australian CD single
(88697745802 Released 11 June 2010)
 "Hearts Beat as One" – 3:40

Charts

Release history

References

External links

Roguetraders.com.au – official website
Hearts Beat as One Music Video
'Hearts Beat as One'; Behind The Scenes
Hearts Beat as One; Single release

2010 singles
Rogue Traders songs
Songs written by James Ash
2010 songs
Columbia Records singles